Marty Flichel (born March 6, 1976) is a Canadian retired professional ice hockey player best known as a player for the Idaho Steelheads in the ECHL. He was selected by the Dallas Stars in the 7th round (228th overall) of the 1994 NHL Entry Draft.

Flichel retired in 2012 as Idaho's all-time leader in games, goals, assists and points. The team retired his number in January 2015.

Career statistics

Awards and honours

References

External links

1976 births
Canadian ice hockey right wingers
Dallas Stars draft picks
Dayton Bombers players
Ice hockey people from Saskatchewan
Idaho Steelheads (ECHL) players
Idaho Steelheads (WCHL) players
Kelowna Rockets players
Living people
Manchester Storm (1995–2002) players
Kalamazoo Wings (1974–2000) players
Nottingham Panthers players
Tacoma Rockets players
Tacoma Sabercats players
Canadian expatriate ice hockey players in England
20th-century Canadian people
21st-century Canadian people